The Women's 800 metres event  at the 2011 European Athletics Indoor Championships was held at March 4–6 with the final being held on March 6 at 16:00 local time.

The original winner, Yevgeniya Zinurova, was later disqualified for doping offences and runner-up Jenny Meadows was promoted to the gold medal position. The original bronze medalist Yuliya Rusanova, who was later elevated to the silver medal position, was subsequently stripped of her medal, due to inconsistencies in her biological passport.

Records

Results

Heat
First 2 in each heat and 4 best performers advanced to the Semifinals. The heats were held at 16:25.

Semifinals 
First 3 in each heat advanced to the Final. The semifinals were held at 15:20.

Final 
The final was held at 16:00.

References 

800 metres at the European Athletics Indoor Championships
2011 European Athletics Indoor Championships
2011 in women's athletics